2-hydroxyacyl-CoA lyase 1 is a protein that in humans is encoded by the HACL1 gene.

References

Further reading 

Genes
Human proteins